Womack Army Medical Center (WAMC) is a United States Army-run military hospital that is located on Fort Bragg near Fayetteville, North Carolina.  The facility is named for Medal of Honor recipient Bryant H. Womack.  It contains 138 beds, with about 66,000 patients visiting the hospital's emergency department, and more than 11,000 patients are admitted yearly. Its physicians perform about 2,700 inpatient and 7,400 outpatient surgeries each year. The Medical Center serves more than 160,000 eligible beneficiaries in the region, the largest beneficiary population in the Army.

History
Camp Bragg Base Hospital was the first military hospital at then Camp Bragg.  It was built in September 1918 with two dispensaries and a headquarters.  The hospital was a 500-bed facility located in 22 buildings.

USA Station Hospital One was built after the first hospital was closed in 1919.  It was built in June, 1932 with an 83-bed, three-story facility.  It closed in 1941 once USA Station Hospital Number Two and Three were built.

USA Station Hospital Number Two and Three were two hospitals built in February 1941.  USA Station Hospital Two has 1,680 beds, and USA Station Hospital Three has 1,002 beds.

On August 3, 1958, the nine-story, 500-bed-capacity Womack Army Community Hospital opened.  The Womack Ambulatory Patient Care Annex opened in March 1974. On October 1, 1991, Womack changed its name to Womack Army Medical Center, Fort Bragg. One year later, on September 3, 1992, officials broke ground for a new Womack.

On March 9, 2000, the new Womack Army Medical Center opened for $400 million.  It is 1,020,359 square feet in size and sits on a 163-acre wooded site.

On June 9, 2017, Womack Army Medical Center earned the Joint Commission’s Gold Seal of Approval for hospital accreditation by demonstrating continuous compliance with its performance standards.

References

 Zavala, Sameria. Womack gains eligible beneficiaries in expanded agreement with Fayetteville VA Medical Center. Paraglide. Retrieved 3 July 2017.

External links
 

Hospital buildings completed in 1958
Hospitals in North Carolina
Buildings and structures in Cumberland County, North Carolina
United States Army medical installations
Military hospitals in the United States
Trauma centers